The 2015 Asia Rugby Women's Championship featured a new name and format after ARFU reorganized the competition. Previously known as the Asian Women's Four Nations, the championship was now called the Asia Rugby Women's Championship. It would be played as a round robin competition. Kazakhstan hosted Hong Kong in Alamaty for the first match. The following games were played as curtain-raisers for the men's ARC games in Fukuoka, Japan on 9 May and in Hong Kong on 23 May. Japan won the Championship.

Table

Results

References 

2015 in Asian rugby union
2015 in women's rugby union
Asia Rugby Women's Championship